Amr Ali (  ; ca. 1988) is a leading member of the April 6 Youth Movement and a prominent Egyptian political activist.

Amr Ali was responsible for the April 6 movement's public works and community operations from September 2009 to August 2011, and was a member of the movement's political office from September 2011 until October 2013. He is an information technology manager from Cairo and currently works as information technology manager at Tenth of Ramadan Investors Association.

On March 6, 2016, he was sentenced to three years of prison.

Election as Coordinator of the April 6 Movement  
In 2013, the 6 April movement held internal elections to determine who would succeed Ahmed Maher as the organization's coordinator.  The vote resulted in Amr Ali's elevation as the movement's new coordinator.

References 

Egyptian dissidents
People of the Egyptian revolution of 2011
Egyptian democracy activists
Egyptian revolutionaries

Living people

1980s births
Year of birth uncertain